Grand Summit is an unincorporated community in Cowley County, Kansas, United States.

History
A post office was opened in Grand Summit in 1882, and remained in operation until it was discontinued in 1933.

Grand Summit was a shipping point on the Atchison, Topeka and Santa Fe Railway. According to the 1910 Census, Grand Summit contained 52 inhabitants.

Education
The community is served by Central USD 462 public school district.

References

Further reading

External links
 Cowley County maps: Current, Historic, KDOT

Unincorporated communities in Cowley County, Kansas
Unincorporated communities in Kansas